Television in Paraguay is most important among the country's mass media. Television programming is dominated by telenovelas, series, and news programming. Private and government-run channels coexist at the national, regional, and local levels. Cable channels are also beginning to appear, most of which are exclusive to the companies that operate them.

Local channels

Others
Personal Sports (Red Albirroja S.A.)
Tigo SAT Network 
Tigo Sports (Teledeportes Paraguay S.A.)
Tigo Max (Teledeportes Paraguay S.A)
One Sports (Gala Producciones Paraguay S.A.)
One Max (Gala Producciones Py S.A.)
Tigo Movies 
Tigo Cinema & Series PPV 
Tigo Music

External links

Latin America
Television stations in Paraguay
Mass media companies of Paraguay